Santa Maria del Carmine (Italian for Our Lady of Mount Carmel) is the name of several churches in Italy:

 Pontifical basilica of 
 Carmine Church, Carrara
 Santa Maria del Carmine, Civita Castellana
 Santa Maria del Carmine, Faenza
 The Basilica of Santa Maria del Carmine, Florence
 Madonna del Carmine, Marsico Nuovo
 Chiesa del Carmine (Messina)
 Santa Maria del Carmine, Milan
 Santa Maria del Carmine, Naples
 Santa Maria del Carmine, Padua
 Santa Maria del Carmine, Pavia
 Santa Maria del Carmine, Pisa
 Santa Maria del Carmine, Pistoia
 Santa Maria del Carmine, Ragusa
 Sanctuary of the Madonna del Carmine, Riccia
 , in Rome
 Beata Vergine del Carmine e San Rocco, Soragna
 Carmini Church, in Venice

See also 
 Our Lady of Mount Carmel (disambiguation)
 Our Lady of Mount Carmel Church (disambiguation)
 Our Lady of Mount Carmel Cathedral (disambiguation)
 Carmine Church (disambiguation)

Our Lady of Mount Carmel